The British Society for Antimicrobial Chemotherapy (BSAC) is a UK-based multi-professional organisation with worldwide membership for clinicians and scientists with a specialist interest in antibiotic management and therapy. It is headquartered in Birmingham, UK.

BSAC was founded in 1971 at a meeting in Prague.

Activities
Current BSAC activities include:
 Publishes the Journal of Antimicrobial Chemotherapy.
 Organises numerous annual educational sessions, workshops and small conferences for clinicians, researchers, clinical scientists and academics.
 Development of national standardised tests to determine micro-organism susceptibility to antibiotics, 
 Surveillance of resistance rates of organisms involved in the development of respiratory infections and bacteraemias.
 Out-patient parenteral antibiotic therapy (OPAT) Initiative.  The OPAT Initiative is involved in the development of a body of evidence that include good practice recommendations, a business case toolkit and a patient management system to support clinicians in the provision of parenteral antibiotics away from the hospital in-patient setting.  
 Advocates appropriate prescribing of antimicrobials including coordinating and submitting UK data on antimicrobial consumption to the European Centre for Disease Prevention and Control (ECDC).
 Point Prevalence Survey (PPS) system and outcomes registry which enables UK hospital Trusts to report antibiotic point prevalence results and to compare and contrast their usage with other Trusts, regions and national administrations.

References

External links
 British Society for Antimicrobial Chemotherapy website

Antimicrobial resistance organizations
Biotechnology organizations
Health in Birmingham, West Midlands
Learned societies of the United Kingdom
Organisations based in Birmingham, West Midlands
Science and technology in the West Midlands (county)
Scientific organisations based in the United Kingdom
Scientific organizations established in 1971